Lado a Lado (Side by Side) is a Brazilian telenovela produced and broadcast by TV Globo from 10 September 2012 to 8 March 2013. It is created by João Ximenes Braga and Claudia Lage, with Chico Soares, Douglas Tourinho, Fernando Rebello, Vellego Jackie, Nina Crintzs and Maria Camargo credited as co-writer. Gilberto Braga serves as the script supervisor and, directed by Dennis Carvalho and Vinicius Coimbra.

The plot revolves around two women from different social classes and race, during the period of abolishment of slavery in the early 20th century. Starring Camila Pitanga and Marjorie Estiano respectively, the main Protagonists. Patrícia Pillar respectively, the main Antagonist. Lázaro Ramos, Thiago Fragoso, Caio Blat, Alessandra Negrini, Sheron Menezzes and Rafael Cardoso in the lead roles.

In November 2013, Lado a Lado was prized as Best telenovela in the 2013 Emmy International.

Plot
Set in Rio de Janeiro's  beginning of the 20th century, Lado a Lado tells the story of a friendship between two women: Isabel (Camila Pitanga), a descendant of a poor slave, and Laura (Marjorie Estiano), a white girl, daughter of a baroness. Despite their very different origins and backgrounds, the two girls become very close while aspiring to a future of equality between men and women, and between black and white people. They meet on their wedding day and build a friendship capable of shaking  the tree of Constância (Patrícia Pillar), Laura's mother, a baroness who refuses to accept the innovations of the twentieth century and the change of the country into a republic.

Cast

Soundtrack

Two albums with music from the telenovela were released by Som Livre. One containing the national soundtrack, was released in November 2012, and the second one, containing the instrumental soundtrack, was released in February 2013.

Awards and nominations

Main Themes
 Laura (Marjorie Estiano) and Isabel's (Camila Pitanga) story had discussions about sexism, female emancipation and sexual freedom of women.
 Laura and Edgar's (Thiago Fragoso) divorce at the beginning of the twentieth century.
 The drama of illegitimate children, represented by Isabel and Albertinho (Rafael Cardoso), Edgar and Catarina (Alessandra Negrini) and other characters.<ref[>http://www.acadahora.com.br/noticia/13397/-Laura-descobre-que-Edgar-tem-uma-filha-com-Catarina </ref>
 The prejudice suffered by single mothers (as Isabel and Catarina) and divorced women (as Laura), and social and cultural inclusion of lower classes and African descent, as José Maria (Lázaro Ramos) and Isabel, after the end of the slavery and monarchy.
 Sexual harassment and attempted rape of Laura.
 Discussions on religious freedom and inclusion of African-Brazilian culture (samba, capoeira, candomblé), as Tia Jurema (Zezé Barbosa), Isabel and José Maria.
 The admission of Laura in a sanatorium, for being studious and oppositional.
 The origin of soccer in Brazil by the elite, and the exclusion of the lower classes.

Historical Inspirations
 Laura was inspired by George Sand, Nísia Floresta and Júlia Lopes de Almeida.
 Isabel was inspired by Josephine Baker.

International broadcast 
Lado a Lado was licensed to CCTV. The deal marks a significant move, given the notorious difficulty of market penetration in China for foreign TV productions. It also strengthens Globo's close relationship with CCTV, which previously acquired further Globo programming such as classic telenovela Escrava Isaura and mini-series .

References

External links
 Lado a Lado - Site oficial da novela das seis da Rede Globo (Official Site)
 Lado a Lado | Lado a Lado: a luta pela liberdade, pela justiça, pelo poder e pelo amor Assista online | Globoplay (Release Video)
 Lado a Lado | Vem aí, a nova novela das seis Assista online | Globoplay (Promotional Video)
 

2012 telenovelas
2012 Brazilian television series debuts
2013 Brazilian television series endings
TV Globo telenovelas
Brazilian telenovelas
International Emmy Award for Best Telenovela
Portuguese-language telenovelas